Nepeta × faassenii, a flowering plant also known as catmint and Faassen's catnip, is a primary hybrid of garden origin. The parent species are Nepeta racemosa and Nepeta nepetella.

It is an herbaceous perennial, with oval, opposite, intricately veined, gray—green leaves, on square stems. The foliage is fragrant.

The plant produces small but showy, abundant, two-lipped, trumpet-shaped, soft lavender flowers, from spring through autumn. Continued blooming is encouraged by deadheading. The seeds are predominantly sterile, and so the plant will not reseed as an invasive species, unlike some other nepeta species.

Cultivation
Nepeta × faassenii is cultivated for its attractive aromatic foliage and masses of blue flowers, as groundcover, border edging, or in pots or rock gardens. It is drought tolerant, and can be deer resistant. It has gained the Royal Horticultural Society's Award of Garden Merit. It was first cultivated by Faassen Nurseries in Tegelen, Netherlands, and named by Bergmans.

Cultivars
Numerous cultivars are available in the trade.

Bred by Michael Dobres NovaFlora LLC, introduced by Star Roses & Plants 
'Blue Wonder' — blue flowers, "Missouri Botanical Garden Plant of Merit".

References

External links
Kemper Center For Home Gardening — Nepeta × faassenii
RHS Plant Selector: Nepeta × faassenii (Garden catmint)

faassenii
Hybrid plants
Groundcovers
Perennial plants
Bird food plants
Butterfly food plants
Drought-tolerant plants